Carolyn Jane Schuler (born January 5, 1943) is an American former competition swimmer, two-time Olympic champion, and former world record-holder.

She represented the United States as a 17-year-old at the 1960 Summer Olympics in Rome, where she won two gold medals.  She received her first gold medal for winning the women's 100-meter butterfly, with a new Olympic record time of 1:09.5.  She earned a second gold medal as a member of the first-place United States team in the women's 4×100-meter medley relay, together with teammates Lynn Burke (backstroke), Patty Kempner (breaststroke), and Chris von Saltza (freestyle).  The winning U.S medley relay set a new world record of 4:41.1 in the event final.

Schuler was inducted into the International Swimming Hall of Fame as an "Honor Swimmer" in 1989.

See also
 List of members of the International Swimming Hall of Fame
 List of Olympic medalists in swimming (women)
 World record progression 4 × 100 metres medley relay

References

External links
 
 
 

1943 births
Living people
American female butterfly swimmers
American female freestyle swimmers
World record setters in swimming
Olympic gold medalists for the United States in swimming
Swimmers from San Francisco
Swimmers at the 1960 Summer Olympics
Medalists at the 1960 Summer Olympics
20th-century American women